The men's 1000 metres at the 2007 Asian Winter Games was held on 1 February 2007 in Changchun, China.

Schedule
All times are China Standard Time (UTC+08:00)

Records

Results

 Takaharu Nakajima was awarded bronze because of no three-medal sweep per country rule.

References
Results
Results

External links
Official website

Men 1000